The following lists events that happened during 2012 in Chile.

Incumbents
 President: Sebastián Piñera (RN)

Events

January
January 1 – 500 people are evacuated because of a wildfire in the commune of Quillón, Biobío Region. Thirty homes are destroyed and one person killed in the fire.

References

 
Years of the 21st century in Chile
2010s in Chile
Chile
Chile